

Walter Herold (10 August 1897 – 28 November 1944) was an officer in the Wehrmacht of Nazi Germany during World War II who commanded several divisions. He was a recipient of the Knight's Cross of the Iron Cross. Herold was killed on 28 November 1944 near Slupia (district) Bochnia,  Poland. He was posthumously promoted to generalmajor.

Awards and decorations

 Knight's Cross of the Iron Cross on 13 October 1941 as Oberstleutnant and commander of Artillerie-Regiment 10 (mot.)

References

Citations

Bibliography

External links
Walter Herold photography in uniform  Generalmajor (Posthumously)

1897 births
1944 deaths
People from Weiden in der Oberpfalz
German Army personnel of World War I
Major generals of the German Army (Wehrmacht)
Military personnel of Bavaria
Recipients of the clasp to the Iron Cross, 1st class
People from the Kingdom of Bavaria
Recipients of the Knight's Cross of the Iron Cross
German Army personnel killed in World War II
German Army generals of World War II